Trintignant is a French surname. Notable people with the surname include:

Jean-Louis Trintignant (1930–2022), French actor
Marie Trintignant (1962–2003), French actress, daughter of Jean-Louis
Maurice Trintignant (1917–2005), French motor racing driver
Nadine Trintignant (born 1934), French film director, former wife of Jean-Louis

French-language surnames